Zhan Shu (born 9 March 1985) is a Chinese former backstroke and medley swimmer who competed in the 2000 Summer Olympics and in the 2004 Summer Olympics.

References

1985 births
Living people
Swimmers from Shenyang
Chinese female backstroke swimmers
Chinese female medley swimmers
Olympic swimmers of China
Swimmers at the 2000 Summer Olympics
Swimmers at the 2004 Summer Olympics
Medalists at the FINA World Swimming Championships (25 m)
Asian Games medalists in swimming
Swimmers at the 2002 Asian Games
World Aquatics Championships medalists in swimming
Universiade medalists in swimming
Asian Games gold medalists for China
Asian Games bronze medalists for China
Medalists at the 2002 Asian Games
Universiade gold medalists for China
Universiade bronze medalists for China
Medalists at the 2003 Summer Universiade
21st-century Chinese women